Osmia alpestris is a species of bee within the genus Osmia, also known as mason bees, that lives within the US states of Utah, Nevada, Wyoming, and Arizona.

References

alpestris
Insects of the United States
Fauna of the Western United States
Insects described in 1986